Daniel Guy Wallin (born March 13, 1927) is an American sound engineer. He was nominated for two Academy Awards in the category Best Sound. Wallin is widely considered one of the most prolific and greatest sound engineers of all time. He has worked on more than 500 films since 1965, working into his eighties.

Selected filmography
 Woodstock (1970)
 A Star Is Born (1976)

References

External links

1927 births
Possibly living people
American audio engineers
People from Los Angeles
Emmy Award winners
Engineers from California